John Robert Cobb (1903–1967), was an American orthopedic surgeon, best known for inventing the Cobb angle, the preferred method of measuring the degree of scoliosis and post-traumatic kyphosis.

Education
Born and raised in Brooklyn, New York City, John R. Cobb attended the Staunton Military Academy in Virginia, and enlisted on a merchant ship at the age of 16 years. He studied English Literature at Brown University in Providence Rhode Island and earned the degree of Bachelor of Arts in Literature in 1925. In his senior year at Brown he decided on a career in medicine and attended Harvard University for one year of post-graduate study in biological sciences. He then attended Yale Medical School, from which he graduated with an MD (Doctor of Medicine) in 1930. He served a one-year surgical internship and a one-year medical residency in orthopedic surgery at Yale – New Haven Hospital. In 1934 Dr. Cobb became the Gibney Orthopedic Fellow at the Hospital for the Ruptured and Crippled in New York. In 1936 he received a Doctor of Medical Sciences degree from Columbia University.

Work
During his work after 1934 at the Hospital for Ruptured and Crippled (today: Hospital for Special Surgery) in New York City, Dr. Cobb developed and led the Margaret Caspary scoliosis clinic. At this time, not much was known about scoliosis or its cause, and there were few effective treatments available. Cobb experimented with various methods and concluded that the most effective approach was to use a turnbuckle plaster jacket in combination with spinal fusion. His studies of thousands of patients showed that only 10% of patients with scoliosis require such surgery. To obtain an accurate and consistent assessment of the severity of spinal deformity, so as to avoid unnecessary surgery, Cobb developed the simple and reliable method for measuring the angle of curvature which has now come to be known as the Cobb angle.John Robert Cobb died on March 24, 1967.

Occupations
Appointed professor of orthopedic surgery at the New York Polyclinic Medical School and Hospital
Appointed orthopedic surgeon to the Seaview Hospital on Staten Island
Assistant visiting orthopedist at the Willard Parker Hospital
Consultant on the staff of the
St. Charles’ Hospital, in Port Jefferson, Long Island,
Eastern New York Orthopedic Hospital School, in Schenectady,
Veterans Administration Hospital, in Castle Point.
Fellow of the New York Academy of Medicine

Membership
American Medical Writers Association
Association of American Medical Colleges
American Academy of Orthopedic Surgeons
American Medical Association
American Geriatrics Society
President of the Alumni Association of the Hospital for Special Surgery

References

20th-century American physicians
American orthopedic surgeons
Brown University alumni
Yale School of Medicine alumni
Columbia University Vagelos College of Physicians and Surgeons alumni
Physicians from New York (state)
1903 births
1967 deaths
Physicians of Hospital for Special Surgery
20th-century surgeons